All You Need Is... is the debut studio album by Scottish band Love and Money, released by Mercury in 1986.

Background
Love and Money formed in 1985 and quickly signed to Phonogram's Mercury Records. In 1986, the band released their debut single "Candybar Express" which was then followed with the album All You Need Is... Although "Candybar Express" gained some attention and reached No. 56 on the UK Singles Chart in May 1986, the album was not a commercial success. A further three singles were released from the album: "Dear John", "River of People" (reached No. 82 in February 1987) and "Love and Money" (reached No. 68 in April 1987). Speaking of the album to Brian Hogg, Grant recalled in 1993: "I can't listen to our first record. I just don't think its very good."

Critical reception

On its release, Billboard praised the group for its "strong songwriting ability and the chops to get it across". They added that Grant, as the group's "focal point", "is capable of impressing even the most casual listener". Bill Henderson of the Orlando Sentinel wrote: "The combinations of hard, punchy rhythms, psychedelic blues guitar and a '60s soul sound recall the best of that era without regurgitating it. The obvious fun that Love and Money had in the recording of this album is contagious."

Jim Kelton of The Everett Herald praised the album as "an honest and straightforward pop record", which contains "satire without sarcasm" and "crackles with anger and excitement", but "is never hysterical, self-indulgent [or] self-righteous". He concluded the album was "catchy, likeable, entertaining and highly promising". Mike Abrams of the Ottawa Citizen praised the "promising start" of "Candybar Express" but felt the following three songs were "weak soul-pop offerings". He also praised the "hot-rocking" "Cheeseburger" as showing the "band at its best". He concluded: "All Love and Money needed was a little more consistency and this would have been a good debut album."

Track listing

Personnel
Love and Money
 James Grant – lead vocals, lead guitar
 Paul McGeechan – keyboards
 Bobbie Paterson - bass
 Stuart Kerr - drums, backing vocals
 Ronnie Goodman - percussion

Production
 Tom Dowd - producer (tracks 2, 3, 4, 6, 8, 9)
 Dave Buscombe - mixing engineer (tracks 2, 3, 4, 6, 7, 8, 9)
 Andy Taylor - producer (track 1)

Other
 The Leisure Process - design
 Steve Golin – photography

References

1986 debut albums
Love and Money (band) albums